Water Colors is the first album by Japanese song writer Ayako Ikeda. It was released in Japan on October 9, 2002. This album includes her second single "Life" which is featured as the main theme for the Japanese TV drama . Also includes her debut single, .

Track listing
All lead vocals were sung by Ayako Ikeda, and arranged by Shohei Narabe.

 Overture - 0:46
  - 6:10
  - 4:16
 Life - 3:43
  - 5:15
 Eternal Wind - 4:22
  - 4:22
  - 4:22
 All Of... - 5:14
 Train - 4:28
 Motto Motto - 5:25	
  - 4:45
 Silent Bells - 6:43

Personnel
Ayako Ikeda - lead and background vocals
Peter Bliss - guitar, bass, mandolin
Chris Maxwell - guitar
David Weiss - irish flute
Ole Mathisen - soprano saxophone
Ty Stephens - background vocals

Ayako Ikeda albums
2002 albums